Evangelical Free Church can refer to the Evangelical Free Church of America, an evangelical Protestant denomination based in the United States.

Evangelical Free Church may also refer to:

Denominations
Evangelical Free Church of Canada, an evangelical Protestant denomination based in Canada
Evangelical Free Church of China, a Protestant denomination headquartered in Hong Kong
Evangelical Free Church of Malaysia, an evangelical denomination headquartered in Malacca
Japan Evangelical Free Church

Other
Evangelical Free Church (Southbridge, Massachusetts), a historic church in that town